Yuryung-Kyuyol (Ürüŋ Küöl) is a rural locality (a selo) and the administrative center of Khadarsky Rural Okrug in Churapchinsky District of the Sakha Republic, Russia, located  from Churapcha, the administrative center of the district. Its population as of the 2010 Census was 564; up from 537 recorded in the 2002 Census.

References

Notes

Sources
Official website of the Sakha Republic. Registry of the Administrative-Territorial Divisions of the Sakha Republic. Churapchinsky District. 

Rural localities in Churapchinsky District